S2 or S II may refer to:

Science and technology
 S2 (star), Milky Way galaxy
 S/2007 S 2, a natural satellite of Saturn
 Disulfur (S2), an allotrope of sulfur
 S2: Keep out of the reach of children, a safety phrase in chemistry
 S2 steel (shock resisting steel)
 S2 map projection, a map projection created at Google

Mathematics
 S2, the two-dimensional sphere
 S2, the permutation group on two elements

Biology and medicine
 British NVC community S2, a swamps and tall-herb fens community in the British National Vegetation Classification system
 Schneider 2 cells, or S2 cells, a commonly used Drosophila cell line

 Secondary somatosensory cortex, a brain area in the parietal cortex
 Sacral spinal nerve 2, a spinal nerve of the sacral segment
 Schedule 2, an Australian legal category assigned to drugs; See Standard for the Uniform Scheduling of Medicines and Poisons
 S2, the second sacral vertebrae
 S2 (heart sound), a sound in cardiac auscultation
 ATC code S02 Otologicals, a subgroup of the Anatomical Therapeutic Chemical Classification System

Computing
 S2 (programming language)
 S2 Spreadsheet, by IBM in 1984

Transportation

Cars
 Audi S2, a turbo-charged sports car
 Lotus Elise S2, a Lotus Elise production series of roadster automobile
 Porsche 944 S2, a 3l naturally aspirated Porsche 944 sports car

Roads and bus routes
 County Route S2 (California)
 Expressway S2 (Poland), a southern bypass of Warsaw
 S2 National Highway, one of the National Highways of Pakistan
 S2 expressway (Shanghai), an expressway in Shanghai also known as the Hulu Expressway
 S2, an abbreviation for a standard single carriageway road, with a single lane going in each direction
 Stagecoach Gold bus route S2, a bus route in Oxfordshire, England

Aviation and space
 Bangladesh (aircraft registration code)
 JetLite (IATA airline code)
 Focke-Wulf S 2, a 1928 German trainer aircraft
 Grumman S-2 Tracker, a 1952 United States Navy anti-submarine warfare (ASW) aircraft
 SABCA S-2, a 1926 Belgian aircraft
 Short S.2, a Short Brothers aircraft
 Strojnik S-2, motorglider
 S-II or S-2, the 2nd stage of the Saturn V rocket

Rail

Locomotives
 Alco S-2, a locomotive
 PRR S2, a unique steam turbine locomotive
 NER Class S2, a class of British steam locomotives

Passenger services
 S2 (Berlin), an S-Bahn service
 S2 (Dresden), an S-Bahn service
 S2 (Munich), an S-Bahn service
 S2 (Nuremberg), an S-Bahn service
 S2 (RER Vaud), an S-Bahn service in Switzerland
 S2 (Rhine-Main S-Bahn), an S-Bahn service
 S2 (Rhine-Ruhr S-Bahn), an S-Bahn service
 S2 (St. Gallen S-Bahn), an S-Bahn line in Switzerland
 S2, a planned Bremen S-Bahn service
 S2, a Hamburg S-Bahn service
 S2, a Hanover S-Bahn service
 S2, a RheinNeckar S-Bahn service
 S2, a Rostock S-Bahn service
 S2, a Stuttgart S-Bahn service
 S2, a Stadtbahn Karlsruhe service
 S2 (ZVV), a service of the S-Bahn Zürich in Switzerland
 Line S2 (BCR), a commuter rail service in Beijing
 Line S2 (Milan suburban railway service)
 FGC line S2, a suburban train service in Barcelona Province

Military
 Soviet submarine S-2, a Soviet World War II submarine
 Grumman S-2 Tracker, a US Navy aircraft
 Finnish torpedo boat S2, which sank in 1925
 USS S-2 (SS-106), a US Navy submarine
 Göta Signal Corps (designation S2), a 1944–1997 Swedish Army signal unit
 S2 (missile), the first deployed French land-based strategic missile
 S-2, a military intelligence officer on the staff of a regiment or battalion
 HMS Rorqual (S02), a 1956 British Royal Navy Porpoise-class submarine
 ORP S-2, Polish World War II motor gun boat

Organisations
 S2 Records, a subsidiary of Sony Music
 S2 (TV channel), a former Scottish television channel
 S2 Games, a video game developer
 S2 Yachts, a defunct sailboat-building company

Products
 Samsung Galaxy S II, an Android smartphone
 Samsung Gear S2, a Tizen smartwatch
 Samsung Galaxy Tab S2, an Android tablet

Cameras
 Nikon S2, a 35mm rangefinder camera produced between 1954 and 1958 as part of the Nikon S-mount range
 Nikon 1 S2, a digital mirrorless interchangeable lens camera
 Canon PowerShot S2 IS, a 2005 5.0 megapixel digital camera
 FinePix S2 Pro, a 2002 interchangeable lens digital single-lens reflex camera by Fuji
 Leica S2, a 2009 37 million pixel medium format digital single-lens reflex camera

Other uses
 S2, a version of the racing simulation Live for Speed
 S2, a district of the S postcode area, covering areas of eastern Sheffield
 Seattle Sounders FC 2, nicknamed S2
 Second year, in the Scottish education system
 S2 (classification), used for categorising swimmers based on their level of disability
 Splatoon 2, a 2017 video game for the Nintendo Switch
 Pitts Special, Two-Seat Aerobatics Biplane